Plaincourault Chapel is a 12th-century chapel of the Knights Hospitaller in Mérigny, Indre, France. The structure, which is located next to the Château de Plaincourault, suffered extensive damage during the French Revolution and was abandoned in 1793. It was declared a historical monument in 1944, but was not restored until the Parc naturel régional de la Brenne took ownership of the property in 1994.  The chapel is famous for its unusual Romanesque art, particularly its Christian frescoes.  As part of the Château de Plaincourault complex, it is designated by the French Ministry of Culture as a monument historique.

References

Further reading
Boudier, Jean Louis Émile (1911). La fresque de Plaincourault (Indre). Bulletin de la Société Mycologique de France 27: 31 - 33.
Samorini, Giorgio (1997). The 'Mushroom-Tree' of Plaincourault, Eleusis: Journal of Psychoactive Plants and Compounds 8: 29–37.

External links
Official site (French)

Chapels in France
Buildings and structures in Indre
Churches in Indre
Church frescos in France
Monuments historiques of Centre-Val de Loire